The 2004 UEFA Women's Cup Final was a two-legged football match that took place on 8 May and 5 June 2004 at Råsunda and Stadion am Bornheimer Hang between Umeå IK of Sweden and 1. FFC Frankfurt of Germany. It was the third time in a row that Umeå made an appearance in the final. Umeå won the final 8–0 on aggregate, avenging their defeat to the same team two years earlier.

Match

Details

First leg

Second leg

External links
2003–04 UEFA Women's Cup season at UEFA.com

Women's Cup
Uefa Women's Cup Final 2004
Uefa Women's Cup Final 2004
2004
UEFA
UEFA
UEFA
May 2004 sports events in Europe
June 2004 sports events in Europe
Sports competitions in Umeå
Football in Frankfurt
Sports competitions in Frankfurt
21st century in Frankfurt
2000s in Hesse